Jarosław Żądło-Dąbrowski (13 November 1836 – 23 May 1871), also known as Jaroslav Dombrowski, was a Polish nobleman and military officer in the Imperial Russian Army, a left-wing independence activist and radical republican for Poland, and general and military commander of the Paris Commune in its final days. He was a participant in the Polish 1863 January Uprising and one of the leaders of the "Red" faction among the insurrectionists as a member of the Central National Committee and the Polish Provisional National Government.

Biography
Dąbrowski was born in 1836, after the Partitions of Poland, in Żytomierz, in the Volhynian Governorate of the Russian Empire, in what is now Zhytomyr in Ukraine. He was the offspring of the old szlachta family Żądło-Dąbrowski z Dąbrówki. He bore the Radwan coat of arms. His father was Wiktor Żądło-Dąbrowski, his mother was Zofia née Falkenhagen-Zaleska.

Military career

In 1845 at age 9, Dąbrowski joined the Imperial Russian Army, enrolling in the officer training corps at the Brest-Litovsk Fortress, where he spent 8 years. He graduated from the St. Petersburg Cadet Corps in 1855. He fought as a Russian officer against uprisings of the local mountain populations in the Caucasian War. In 1859 he enrolled in the General Staff Academy in St. Petersburg. There he was one of the leaders of the secret "Officers' Committee of the First Army". Members included several hundred Russian and Polish officers, cooperating with the revolutionary "Zemlya i Volya" (Land and Liberty) movement. He became involved in the preparation of the January Uprising, but was arrested on 14 August 1862, and exiled to Siberia for his participation in a plot against the Tsar, Alexander II. In 1865, he escaped and fled to France.

On the barricades in Paris

In early March 1871, following months of siege by the Prussians and the capture of Napoleon III by the Prussian Army, a socialist-anarchist coalition called the Paris Commune seized power in Paris and declared itself independent of the French government. Dąbrowski was elected to the Council of the Paris Commune, using the phonetic spelling Jaroslav Dombrowski.  As one of the few Commune soldiers with military experience,  he was soon named Commander-in-Chief of the Commune forces.

On 21 May 1871, shortly after he was named commander, the French Army attacked and entered Paris. The first reaction of many of the National Guard was to find someone to blame, and Dąbrowski was the first to be accused. Rumors circulated he accepted a million francs to give up the city. He was deeply offended by the rumors. They stopped when he died two days later from wounds received on the barricades. His last reported words were, "Do they still say I was a traitor?" The Commune fell on 28 May 1871.

Misidentification with pianist Henri Dombrowski
A photographic portrait, taken before 1870, of Paris pianist Henri Dombrowski was falsely portrayed as depicting General Jarosław Dąbrowski by photographer Pierre Petit. Petit sold 200,000 copies of the photo. Henri Dombrowski demanded damages. The misidentification with pianist Henri Dombrowski can be seen in many monuments and portrayals of Jarosław Dąbrowski as a result of Petit's actions.

Legacy

Several schools and roads are named after him in Poland; among them most notable is the Military University of Technology in Warsaw. In the Spanish Civil War (1936–1939), – the Dabrowski Battalion and various brigade-strength units (known in Polish as the Dąbrowszczacy) – were named in his honour.

See also
 Paris Commune
Fire in the Minds of Men: Origins of the Revolutionary Faith
James H. Billington
List of Poles

References

Bibliography
 .
 .
 .
 .
 .
 .
 .
 .

External links

 The Library of Congress: James Hadley Billington
 Banknote, featuring JAROSŁAW DĄBROWSKI – Denomination: 200 złoty; Country of Issue: Poland; Year Issued: 1986
 Theme music from the movie: JAROSŁAW DĄBROWSKI (1976); Music by Wojciech Kilar
 Movie (in Polish): JAROSŁAW DĄBROWSKI (released: 26 January 1976) directed by Bohdan Poręba (length: 2 hours, 12 minutes)
 (SEA VESSEL) S.S. JAROSŁAW DĄBROWSKI: Built: 1950; Gross Tonnage: 3,196; Deadweight Tonnage: 2,667; Builder: Blyth Shipbuilding Company, Blyth, Northumberland county, England, UK; Owner: Polish Ocean Lines, Gdynia, Pomerania province, Poland
 (SEA VESSEL) S.S. JAROSŁAW DĄBROWSKI: Rendsburg, Rendsburg-Eckernförde district, Schleswig-Holstein state, Kiel Canal, Germany; 04-September-1966; Built: 1950; Gross Tonnage: 3,196; Deadweight Tonnage: 2,667; Builder: Blyth Shipbuilding Company, Blyth, Northumberland county, England, UK; Owner: Polish Ocean Lines, Gdynia, Pomerania province, Poland
 Song "March of Dąbrowski Brigade" (in Polish) – See: Dąbrowski Brigade and Spanish Civil War (1936–1939)
 Photographic Portrait, Taken Before 1870, of Paris Pianist Henri Dombrowski, Falsely Portrayed as Depicting General Jarosław Dąbrowski by photographer Pierre Petit.

1836 births
1871 deaths
Burials at Père Lachaise Cemetery
Jaroslaw
Military personnel of the Russian Empire
Military personnel  from Zhytomyr
People from Zhitomirsky Uyezd
People from the Russian Empire of Polish descent
Polish generals
Communards